Space Is the Place is a studio album by Sun Ra. It was originally released on the Blue Thumb label in 1973. In 1998, it was reissued by Impulse! Records.

Critical reception

Stephen Cook of AllMusic commented that "Space Is the Place provides an excellent introduction to Sun Ra's vast and free-form jazz catalog." He called it "a fine recording and a must for Sun Ra fans." Stevie Chick of BBC described the album's title track as "Sun Ra's ultimate anthem, espousing the fusion of science fiction and ancient myth with the panoply of jazz that would seduce Sun Ra fans on rock's innovative vanguard, the likes of the MC5, Sonic Youth and Primal Scream."

Track listing

Personnel
Credits adapted from liner notes.

Sun Ra and His Astro Intergalactic Infinity Arkestra

 Sun Ra – Farfisa organ (1, 3, 4, 5), piano (2), arrangement
 Akh Tal Ebah – vocals (1), trumpet (2), flugelhorn (4)
 Kwame Hadi (Lamont McClamb) – trumpet (2, 4)
 Marshall Allen – flute (3), alto saxophone (4)
 Danny Davis – flute (3), alto saxophone (4)
 John Gilmore – vocals (1, 5), tenor saxophone (2, 3, 4)
 Danny Thompson – baritone saxophone (1), flute (3), vocals (5)
 Eloe Omoe – bass clarinet (1, 5), flute (3)
 Pat Patrick – bass guitar (1, 2), baritone saxophone (4), vocals (5)
 Lex Humphries – drums (4)
 Atakatun (Stanley Morgan) – percussion (4)
 Odun (Russel Branch) – percussion (4)

Space Ethnic Voices

 June Tyson – vocals (1, 5)
 Ruth Wright – vocals (1, 5)
 Cheryl Banks – vocals (1, 5)
 Judith Holton – vocals (1, 5)

Technical

 Alton Abraham – production
 Ed Michel – production
 Baker Bigsby – engineering
 Steve Skinder – engineering assistance
 Jim Dolan – engineering assistance
 Mitch Hennes – engineering assistance
 Preston Wakeland – engineering assistance
 Dominic Lumetta – engineering assistance
 Jim Newman – photography (Impulse! Records edition)
 Chuck Stewart – photography (Impulse! Records edition)
 Hollis King – art direction (Impulse! Records edition)
 Señora Brown – graphic design (Impulse! Records edition)

References

External links
 

1973 albums
Sun Ra albums
Blue Thumb Records albums
Impulse! Records albums
Spiritual jazz albums